APRE are an English alternative pop duo formed in Kent in 2018, comprising two members: Charlie Brown, and Jules Konieczny. Their debut single ("All Yours") was released on 10 April 2018, followed by their debut EP (The Movement of Time) on 25 May 2018. Upon its release, "All Yours" hit number-one on Hype Machine.

Background
APRE comprises two members: Charlie Brown, and Jules Konieczny. Brown and Konieczny met at Ealing Chess Club, where the owner used to let them use the back-room to rehearse and record music. Both studied BA Creative Musicianship at The Institute of Contemporary Music Performance in London.

Career
Their debut single, "All Yours", was released on 10 April 2018 through their own label Beach 91; named after a sign on Ealing Chess Club's garden shed. This was succeeded by the release of "Don't You Feel Like Heaven?" on 24 May 2018; both of which then appeared on their debut EP (The Movement of Time) released on 25 May 2018. Their second EP, Drum Machines Killed Music, was released on 14 September 2018; featuring the singles "Without Your Love" and "Everybody Loves You". The band released their first single with Polydor, "Backstreet", on 16 October 2018. Preceded by the release of "Gap Year 2008" on 7 February 2019, their third EP - Everyone's Commute - was released on 29 March 2019. A 12" vinyl containing tracks from their three EPs to date (The Movement of Time, Drum Machines Killed Music, and Everyone's Commute) was released on 13 April 2019 as part of Record Store Day 2019.

Discography

Studio albums

Mixtapes

Extended plays

Singles

Awards and nominations

Tours

References

External links
 
APRE official website

Musical groups established in 2017
English musical duos
English rock music groups
Rock music duos
Musical groups from Kent
2017 establishments in England